Făureşti may refer to several places:

In Romania:
Făurești, a commune in Vâlcea County
 Făureşti, a village in Copalnic-Mănăștur Commune, Maramureș County
 Făureşti, a village in Zătreni Commune, Vâlcea County

In Moldova:
 Făureşti, a village in Ciorescu Commune, Chişinău municipality